Bristol & West Building Society v Ellis [1996] is an English land law case, concerning mortgage arrears, specifically the definition of "such time as the court thinks reasonable" for its suspension of possession orders under section 36 of the Administration of Justice Act 1970.

It was held on the facts that the delay was not appropriate because there was a risk that if the delay was granted, the mortgagor’s debt would rise too much, possibly into negative equity, which outweighed the interest in the two children completing their higher and further education respectively.

Facts
Mrs Ellis fell into arrears after her husband left. A credible payment plan for her would have taken 98 years. She applied for suspension of a warrant for possession because she wanted sell the property in three to five years when her children had finished full-time education. To support her application, she gave the opinions of estate agents showing what the likely sale price would be. This was argued to be enough to discharge the debt and therefore the mortgage, balancing the interests of her children and the interest of the lender who was no longer receiving full mortgage instalments.

The Judge (at first instance, the court below the appeal made) granted an order to delay.

Judgment
The two-member panel in the Court of Appeal through the written judgment of Auld LJ held that the delay was not appropriate because there was a risk that if the delay was granted, the mortgagor’s debt would rise too much. The total debt was £70k plus £10k interest. Auld LJ held that the estate agents’ opinions were not good enough. The court will need evidence or at least some informal material before the court is satisfied of what period for sale is reasonable.

See also

English land law
English trusts law
English property law

References

English land case law
Court of Appeal (England and Wales) cases
1997 in case law
1997 in British law